Benjie is a given name. Notable people with the name include:

 Benjie Paras (born 1968), Filipino actor, comedian, basketball player, and coach
 Benjie E. Wimberly (born 1964), American writer and politician